The Saalach is a  river in Austria and Germany, and a left tributary of the Salzach.

Course 
From there it flows initially eastwards through the  valley, through Hinterglemm, then the ski resort of Saalbach – at the latest from there it is known as the Saalach – until it bends north at Maishofen. It follows the broad valley to Saalfelden, and meanders further on through the narrow valley between the Leoganger and Loferer Steinberge and the Steinernes Meer to Lofer in north-western direction. There it enters a narrow gorge, famous for its white water rafting. Crossing the border to Bavaria (Germany) at Melleck (part of Schneizlreuth) it flows along the northern slopes of the Reiter Alpe known for its climbing routes. The power plant provides the energy for the railway line Salzburg, Freilassing, Bad Reichenhall to Berchtesgaden. Having passed Staufeneck, the Saalach leaves the mountains and enters the flat forests called Saalachau.

References

Rivers of Bavaria
Rivers of Tyrol (state)
International rivers of Europe
Rivers of Salzburg (state)
Austria–Germany border
Kitzbühel Alps
Salzburg Slate Alps
Chiemgau Alps
Rivers of Austria
Rivers of Germany
Border rivers